Cornelius Wilhelmus Els (born 19 January 1994) is a South African professional rugby union player for the Benetton in Pro14. His regular position is hooker.

Career

Youth / Free State

Els attended and played rugby for Grey College in Bloemfontein and was selected to represent the Free State at the Under-16 Grant Khomo Week in 2010 and once again at the premier high school rugby union competition in South Africa – the Under-18 Craven Week – held in Port Elizabeth in 2012.

Blue Bulls

After school, Els moved to Pretoria to join the  academy. He was the first-choice hooker for the  side in the 2013 Under-19 Provincial Championship and started ten of their fourteen matches during the campaign and played off the bench in one further match. His performances contributed to the Blue Bulls finishing the round-robin stage of the season with twelve wins out of twelve to qualify for the title play-offs. He started both their 37–21 win against the Leopards in the semi-final and in the final, where they won the competition by beating trans-Jukskei rivals s 35–23.

At the beginning of 2014, Els represented Pretoria-based university side  in the 2014 Varsity Cup competition. He played in six of their seven matches as they finished in sixth spot and outside the semi-final places. Shortly after the Varsity Cup campaign, Els was named in the South African Under-20 squad as they prepared for the 2014 IRB Junior World Championship in New Zealand. He was not on the bench for their first pool stage match against Scotland, but failed to come on as a replacement. However, he was promoted to the starting line-up for their second match against New Zealand, helping them to a 33–24 win over the hosts, and also started their final pool stage match against Samoa as South Africa won 21–8 to qualify for the semi-finals. He started their semi-final match where they once again faced New Zealand and provided a crucial contribution in the match; with the score tied at 25–all with three minutes to go in the match, Els scored a late try which was converted by Handré Pollard to secure a 32–25 victory for South Africa and a place in the final. He also started the final, but could not prevent South Africa losing 20–21 to England to finish the competition as runners-up.

Shortly after his return to South Africa, Els was rewarded with a new contract with the Blue Bulls, keeping him in Pretoria until the end of 2016.

The following year, Els was included in the  squad for the 2015 Vodacom Cup competition.

Els was included in the ' senior squad for the 2015 Currie Cup Premier Division and was named as the hooker replacement for their Round Four match against  in Kimberley.

References

South African rugby union players
Living people
1994 births
People from Polokwane
Rugby union hookers
Blue Bulls players
South Africa Under-20 international rugby union players
Rugby union players from Limpopo
Bulls (rugby union) players
Pumas (Currie Cup) players
Benetton Rugby players